Constandinos Himonas (born 1964) is an American lawyer and former judge who served as a justice of the Utah Supreme Court from 2015 to 2022.

Early life and education 

Himonas is originally from Price, Utah and has Greek heritage. He graduated from the University of Utah in 1986 and received his Juris Doctor from the University of Chicago Law School in 1989.

Legal career 

Prior to taking the bench, Himonas worked for 15 years at the law firm of Jones, Waldo, Holbrook & McDonough. Prior to being confirmed to the Utah Supreme Court, Himonas served as a trial judge in the 3rd District Court.

Utah Supreme Court 

After being nominated by Governor Gary Herbert, he was unanimously confirmed by the Utah Senate to the position. He resigned on March 1, 2022.

Notable rulings and selected opinions

In re Gray and Rice 
This opinion, authored by Justice Himonas, deals with the right of transgender individuals to change their legal sex designation on their birth certificates. This case was an appeal by two transgender individuals—Sean Childers-Gray, a transgender man, and Angie Rice, a transgender woman—who had petitioned the Utah District Court for the right to change both their name and sex designation on their birth certificate. The District Court granted the name change but refused the sex change. Justice Himonas, and a majority of the Utah Supreme Court ultimately found that "A person has a common-law right to change facets of their personal legal status, including their sex designation." This decision rested upon the common-law right to change one's own name as well as a Utah statute that tied sex designation changes to name changes.

References

External links
http://www.sltrib.com/home/1965736-155/gov-herbert-nominates-deno-himonas-for
http://www.utah.gov/governor/news_media/article.html?article=10667

1964 births
Living people
21st-century American judges
American people of Greek descent
Justices of the Utah Supreme Court
People from Price, Utah
Utah lawyers
University of Utah alumni
University of Chicago Law School alumni